Stefano Dacastello (born 17 February 1980) is an Italian long jumper and sprinter.

He won one medal at the International athletics competitions.

Biography
He has 9 caps in national team from 2002 to 2006.

National titles
Stefano Dacastello has won 3 times the individual national championship.
3 wins in long jump (2004, 2005, 2011)

See also
 Italian all-time lists - Long jump
 Italy national relay team

References

External links
 

1980 births
Living people
People from Bra, Piedmont
Italian male sprinters
Italian male long jumpers
Athletics competitors of Fiamme Gialle
Universiade medalists in athletics (track and field)
Universiade bronze medalists for Italy
Medalists at the 2005 Summer Universiade
Sportspeople from the Province of Cuneo